Athoracophorus suteri is a leaf-veined slug, a species of air-breathing land slug, a terrestrial gastropod mollusc in the family Athoracophoridae.

References

Further reading 
 Powell A. W. B., New Zealand Mollusca, William Collins Publishers Ltd, Auckland, New Zealand 1979 
 NZETC

Athoracophoridae
Gastropods of New Zealand
Gastropods described in 1963